

Draw

Group 1

References

External links
 Women's Legends Doubles

Women's Legends Doubles